The Lycée Hoche is a public secondary school located in Versailles, France. Formerly, it had been a nunnery founded by French queen Marie Leszczyńska. However, after the French Revolution, it became a school in 1803. In 1888, the school was named "Lycée Hoche" after the French general Lazare Hoche who was born in Versailles.

Together with Lycée Henri-IV, Lycée Louis-le-Grand, Lycée Saint-Louis, Lycée Stanislas and Lycée Sainte-Geneviève, the Lycée Hoche is one of the most prestigious secondary schools in France. Each year, many of the students coming from its preparatory classes are admitted to France's prestigious grandes écoles, such as the École Polytechnique, the École Normale Supérieure, HEC Paris and ESSEC Business School. Admission to Lycée Hoche is very competitive; the strict selection process is based on academic grades, drawing from middle schools (for entry into high school) and high schools (for entry into the preparatory classes) throughout France. Its educational standards are highly rated and the working conditions are considered optimal due to its demanding recruitment of teachers. Students generally achieve excellent results; topping national rankings for baccalauréat grades in high school and entry into the best grandes écoles in the preparatory classes.

The school consists of four buildings. The S building houses science classrooms and a large multi-sports gymnasium. In the C building are situated the literature, language, and mathematic classrooms. The C building was the former Queen's nunnery classified as a historical monument since 1926. The D building is where preparatory classes, history, and geography are located. Finally, the arts and music rooms are established in the B building.

The 200 years history of this school can be found in the recent book (June 2010) written by the French teacher Marie-Louise Mercier-Jouve: "Le lycee Hoche de Versailles, deux cents ans d'histoire" edited by Patrice Dupuy's editions, Paris.

Famous alumni

 Francisco I. Madero
 Raymond Aron
 Alain Berton (Chemist)
 Edward Carpenter
 Henri Cartan (Wolf Prize recipient)
 Pierre Clostermann
 Jean-Marie Colombani
 Barthélemy Prosper Enfantin
 Louis Franchet d'Espèrey
 Louis Halphen
 Jules Antoine Lissajous
 Charles Mangin
 Philippe Morillon
 Duško Popov
 Jean-Cyril Spinetta
 alternative rock Phoenix (band)
 Louis Valtat
 Boris Vian
 Wendelin Werner (Fields medalist)
 Dr. Daniel Choukroun

See also

 Lycée Henri-IV
 Lycée Louis-le-Grand
 Secondary education in France
 Education in France

External links
 http://www.lyc-hoche-versailles.ac-versailles.fr/
http://www.amismuseehoche.fr/
http://www.lyc-hoche-versailles.ac-versailles.fr/spip.php?article126

Lycées in Yvelines
Educational institutions established in 1803
Schools in Versailles